The brownish elaenia (Elaenia pelzelni) is a species of bird in the family Tyrannidae, the tyrant flycatchers.
It is found along the Amazon Basin rivers of Brazil; also northern Peru and the adjacent border of Colombia; also Bolivia. The rivers are the Xingu, Iriri, Madeira, and Juruá of Brazil, and the Marañón of Peru.
Its natural habitat is subtropical or tropical moist lowland forests.

Range
The brownish elaenia is found in the central Amazon Basin, along the Amazon River, in contiguous river corridors, about 125 km wide. Downstream in the east, the bird's range starts at the confluence of the Xingu River in the south of Pará state, North Region, Brazil; it ranges upstream on the Xingu for 700 km, then a tributary to the west of the Xingu, the Rio Iriri, for another 700 km.

The next upstream tributary for the bird's range, is the Madeira River in the Amazon Basin's southwest, Amazonas state. The range proceeds 2400 km upstream into the headwaters of the Madeira in northern Bolivia. To the west the brownish elaenia's range continues as the Amazon River becomes the Marañón River and proceeds to the headwaters in northern Peru; this is also along the Amazonas, Brazil-Colombia border, of about 200 km. One further tributary is home to the brownish elaenia, a tributary, the Juruá River from the Amazon River to the southwest, of about 950 km.

References

External links
State maps with rivers: Amazonas; Pará
Brownish elaenia photo gallery VIREO

brownish elaenia
Birds of the Amazon Basin
brownish elaenia
Taxonomy articles created by Polbot